In enzymology, a dicarboxylate—CoA ligase is an enzyme that catalyzes the chemical reaction

ATP + an alphaomega-dicarboxylic acid + CoA  AMP + diphosphate + an omega-carboxyacyl-CoA

The 3 substrates of this enzyme are ATP, alphaomega-dicarboxylic acid, and CoA, whereas its 3 products are AMP, diphosphate, and omega-carboxyacyl-CoA.

This enzyme belongs to the family of ligases, specifically those forming carbon-sulfur bonds as acid-thiol ligases.  The systematic name of this enzyme class is omega-dicarboxylate:CoA ligase (AMP-forming). Other names in common use include carboxylyl-CoA synthetase, and dicarboxylyl-CoA synthetase.

References

 

EC 6.2.1
Enzymes of unknown structure